In the 2017 season, the Burmese football club Yangon United F.C. finished in second position in the Myanmar National League.

Season review

2017 squad

Coaching staff
{|class="wikitable"
|-
!Position
!Staff
|-
|Manager|| U Tin Maung Tun
|-
|rowspan="2"|Assistant Manager|| Myo Min Tun
|-
| U Than Wai
|-
|Technical Coach|| U Nyan Win
|-
|Goalkeeper Coach|| U Win Naing
|-
|Fitness Coach|| U Zaw Naing
|-

Other information

|-

References

Yangon United